"Someone Else Not Me" is a song by English rock band Duran Duran, released as the only single from their 10th studio album, Pop Trash (2000). It charted at number 26 in Italy and number 53 on the UK Singles Chart.

About the song 
The song is a melancholy ballad, and the only song on the Pop Trash album with lyrics actually written by vocalist Simon Le Bon; the rest were composed by bandmates Nick Rhodes and Warren Cuccurullo. Live performances of this song on television shows and their 1999 and 2000–2001 tours featured a harder-edged style with much more prominent guitar.

Chart performance 
"Someone Else Not Me" reached number 53 in the United Kingdom and entered the top 30 in Italy, reaching number 26.

Music video 
The video was the first to be created entirely in Macromedia Flash animation, by web design firm Fullerene Productions (who also created the band's Flash-based official website).

B-sides, bonus tracks and remixes 
At Le Bon's request, the lyrics were translated into French and Spanish so he could record alternate versions, which were included as bonus tracks on various global releases:

 "Un Autre Que Moi" ("Someone Else Not Me" en Français) – 4:19
 "Alguien Que No Soy Yo" ("Someone Else Not Me" en Español) – 4:16

The B-side is "Starting to Remember".

Track listing 
CD: Hollywood / 0108845HWR (UK)
 "Someone Else Not Me" (radio edit) – 3:35
 "Someone Else Not Me" (album version) – 4:47
 "Starting to Remember" – 2:38

Personnel 
 Simon Le Bon – vocals
 Warren Cuccurullo – guitar
 Nick Rhodes – keyboards

Charts

Release history

References

Duran Duran songs
1999 songs
2000 singles
Hollywood Records singles
Songs written by Nick Rhodes
Songs written by Simon Le Bon
Songs written by Warren Cuccurullo